Nicole Westmarland (born 1977) is an academic and activist in the area of violence against women. She is currently a professor at the University of Durham, where she researches rape, domestic violence and prostitution. With Geetanjali Gangoli, she has edited two books: International Approaches to Rape, and International Approaches to Prostitution: Law and Policy in Europe and Asia. Originally a taxi driver, Westmarland’s first publication focused upon security issues for female taxi drivers, following her finding that female drivers were significantly more likely to face sexual harassment from customers than their male counterparts.

Alongside her academic work, Westmarland is often in the news as a commentator on violence against women. She has appeared on BBC Radio 4's Woman's Hour and written articles for The Telegraph, The Guardian and the New Statesman. In 2007 Westmarland organised the 1st North East Conference on Sexual Violence, which brought together professionals from across various statutory and charity organisations to share knowledge and develop best practice in responding to sexual violence. The conference now runs annually in recognition of the International Day for the Elimination of Violence Against Women. Westmarland has sat on both governmental and non-governmental advisory panels, and chaired  for five years.

Biography
 Westmarland was born in 1977 in Darlington, County Durham, England. She began her academic career at the University of Teesside, where she studied for a BSc (Hons) in Psychology and Women's Studies. She then went on to study at the University of York, where she completed an MA in Women's Studies and a PhD in Social Policy and Social Work.

Westmarland spent her early career working at the University of Bristol. It was here she met Geetanjali Gangoli, with whom she co-edited International Approaches to Prostitution (2006), and later International Approaches to Rape (2011). During her time in Bristol, Westmarland published a number of articles and official reports concerning violence against women, with a particular focus upon the issues of domestic violence and prostitution. In addition to her academic work, Westmarland plays a significant role within grassroots feminist action and organisation, and it was through volunteering for feminist campaign "Truth about Rape" that she first became involved with Rape Crisis.
In 2006, Westmarland became chair of Rape Crisis England and Wales, a position which she held for five years.

Following her time in Bristol, Westmarland returned to the North East to take up a position as Lecturer in Criminology at Durham University. In 2011, she was promoted to Senior Lecturer. She continues to combine academic work with feminist activism, allowing her research to both inform and be informed by grassroots groups. Her most recent work investigated women's views of the police's response to sexual violence, ahead of the forthcoming elections for the creation of Police and crime commissioners.

Areas of work

Rape and sexual violence
Though she is based within the UK, Westmarland has collaborated with academics from across the world. In 2011, Westmarland and Geetanjali Gangoli published International Approaches to Rape, which combines contributions from international experts to produce a cohesive account of rape law and policy in 10 different countries. International Approaches to Rape illustrates the ways in which countries' approaches to rape interact with women's experiences; and highlights the various interventions and support available within each country.

Rape Crisis 
Westmarland chaired Rape Crisis England and Wales for five years. Rape Crisis is a registered charity which supports victim-survivors of sexual assault and campaigns to raise awareness of sexual violence. The organisation regularly features in Westmarland's work, with publications focusing upon assessment of the services provided by Rape Crisis centres, the Rape Crisis movement as a whole, and the lack of funding and concomitant closure of centres.

In 2012 Westmarland and her colleagues published an evaluation of Rape Crisis centres. They found that women's health and well-being had improved following Rape Crisis counselling, with particularly positive results in certain areas. For example, following counselling, twice as many women felt in control of their life. The number of women who reported experiencing flashbacks about what happened to them was reduced from 84% to 57%, and the number of women who experienced panic attacks fell from 68% to 43%. There were also reductions in other areas. Following counselling, less than half of the women who had initially reported self-harm were still using this as a coping mechanism, whilst the percentage of women using alcohol to help them cope had reduced from 28% to 11%. Though many women still felt depressed, the number reporting this issue had fallen from 72% to 56%. Around two-fifths of those who had reported suicidal feelings at the initial assessment no longer had thoughts of ending their life. When they first visited Rape Crisis, nearly half of the women (45%) felt too unwell to work or study. Following counselling, this figure was reduced to 29% of women. Overall the study found that the support provided by Rape Crisis centres was associated with a reduction on all measures of distress created by sexual assault.

Police responses to victim-survivors 
Research carried out in 2012 by Westmarland and colleagues found that women do not think that the police take rape, domestic violence and stalking as seriously as they should. The research, which surveyed 577 women across the North East and Cumbria, found that only half of women would report domestic violence (49%) or stalking (53%) if it happened to them. Whilst most women (89%) said that they would report rape by a stranger, fewer would choose to report rape if it was committed by someone they knew (68%). Women who said that they would not report these crimes cited various reasons; including lack of trust in the police, fear of re-victimisation by the Criminal Justice System, and the emotional impact of pursuing a prosecution. It was found that this pattern was similar across all four police areas in the region: Northumbria, Durham, Cumbria and Cleveland. Westmarland noted:
 We know that the police have put additional resources and effort into improving both victim care and investigations. However, this research shows women are still reluctant to make that first step and report these crimes to the police.

The Stern Review 
In 2009, Westmarland was among a team of academics commissioned to provide information for The Stern Review, an independent investigation into the ways in which public authorities respond to rape complaints. Along with Jennifer Brown, Miranda Horvath and Liz Kelly, Westmarland authored a research review which summarised information about rape in the UK, including its prevalence, the support available to victim-survivors, the responses of the health and criminal justice services, and the effect of policy changes.

Westmarland and her colleagues were asked to report upon whether people's attitudes to rape have changed over time. To achieve this, they re-ran a survey which was originally carried out in 1977. Over 2000 participants filled in the survey online, and their responses were compared to those given in 1977. Opinions related to the victim-survivor had shifted: fewer people believed that a woman is responsible if she is raped (34% in 1977; 15% in 2010), and fewer people thought that the victim’s prior sexual experience should be taken into account in the punishment of those found guilty of rape (42% in 1977; 19% in 2010). Respondents were also asked how they would react if a man tried to rape them. In 1977, 65% of women said that they would resist, but in 2010, only 28% said they would resist, with the majority saying that they didn’t know or that it would depend on the situation. Westmarland and colleagues suggest that this change may be due to a wider understanding of the different contexts in which rape takes place.

Domestic violence
Westmarland is currently a project investigator for research into the utility of community domestic violence perpetrator programmes. Domestic violence perpetrator programmes aim to change men's abusive behaviour through a combination of therapeutic intervention and facilitating awareness of the consequences of their actions. Though they are common within the criminal justice system, community based programmes are rare, partly due to a lack of evidence as to their efficacy. Westmarland and her research team at Durham University's Crime, Violence and Abuse group are collaborating with Liz Kelly and colleagues at the Child and Woman Abuse Studies Unit, London Metropolitan University and Charlotte Watts at the Gender Violence and Health Centre, London School of Hygiene and Tropical Medicine to assess the impact of community domestic violence perpetrator programmes on women and children's safety, as well as investigating related questions such as which specific factors enable violent men to change their behaviour. The research is an independent investigation based upon key issues raised by perpetrator programme workers, via Respect, the UK's umbrella organisation for domestic violence perpetrator programmes.

Prostitution
Westmarland's first book, International Approaches to Prostitution: Law and Policy in Europe and Asia, was co-edited with Geetajanli Gangoli and published in 2006. This is all topical research that is political correct and thus gains immense media attention, but there are equally important topics where there is really serious scholarship that is ignored as the media ignore the issue. The media is fixated with anything to do with sex offences so it is an easy place to have impact. The book addresses prostitution in various European and Asian countries, including England, Sweden, Pakistan and Thailand. The book was the first in a series which also includes International Approaches to Rape. In addition to co-editing this book, Westmarland also co-authored a Home Office report summarising research into issues surrounding street prostitution, such as how to reduce the number of people involved in prostitution, and how to reduce the crime that is associated with street based prostitution.

Bibliography

Rape and Sexual Violence

 
See also:  

 Westmarland, Nicole; Gangoli, Geetanjali (2011), "Introduction: Approaches to rape", in 
 Westmarland, Nicole (2011), "Still little justice for rape victim survivors: The void between policy and practice in England and Wales", in

Domestic Violence

Prostitution
 
 Westmarland, Nicole; Gangoli, Geetanjali (2006), "Introduction: Approaches to prostitution", in 
 Westmarland, Nicole (2006), "From the personal to the political – Shifting perspectives on street prostitution in England and Wales", in

See also
Rape Crisis England and Wales
Rape crisis center
Women's Aid Federation of England

References

External links 
 Nicole Westmarland's website
 Nicole Westmarland's webpage at Durham University

British women academics
Living people
British criminologists
British women's rights activists
Domestic violence academics
People from Darlington
Academics of Durham University
Alumni of Teesside University
1977 births
Alumni of the University of York
Academics of the University of Bristol
British women criminologists